Ariel Eduardo Rotenberg Gutkin (born 19 April 1960), better known as Ariel Rot, is an Argentine musician.

Rot moved to Spain when he was young and became a member of the group Tequila. Later, he began his solo musical career, after which he joined the group Los Rodríguez (1990–96). More recently, he has returned to solo performing. His sister, Cecilia Roth, is an actress. In April 2007, Ariel recorded Duos, trios y perversiones, an album which included his most popular songs and featured artists such as Enrique Bunbury from Heroes del Silencio, Andrés Calamaro, and Quique Gonzalez.

Discography

with Tequila
 Matrícula de Honor (1978)
 Rock and Roll (1979)
 Viva Tequila (1980)
 Confidencial (1981)

with Los Rodríguez
 Buena Suerte (1991)
 Disco Pirata (1992)
 Sin Documentos (1993)
 Palabras más, palabras menos (1995)
 Hasta luego  (1996)
 Para no olvidar (2002)

Solo
 Debajo del puente (1983)
 Vértigo (1985)
 Hablando solo (1997)
 Cenizas en el aire (1999)
 En vivo mucho mejor (2001)
 Lo siento Frank (2003)
 Acústico (2003)
 Ahora piden tu cabeza (2005)
 Duos, trios y otras perversiones (2007)
 Solo Rot (2010)
 La Huesuda (2013)
 La Manada (2016)

References

External links

 

1960 births
Living people
20th-century Argentine male singers
Argentine rock singers
Singers from Buenos Aires
21st-century Argentine male singers